Brwinów railway station is a railway station in Brwinów, Poland.  The station is served by Koleje Mazowieckie, who run trains from Skierniewice to Warszawa Wschodnia.

References
Station article at kolej.one.pl

Railway stations in Poland opened in 1848
Pruszków County
Railway stations served by Koleje Mazowieckie
Railway stations in Masovian Voivodeship